Jesse Lizarraga (born August 25, 1950), known by the ring name Jesse Hernandez, is an American professional wrestler, referee, trainer, and actor. He is the owner of the independent wrestling organization Empire Wrestling Federation, based in San Bernardino, California. He has trained or helped train wrestlers such as Melina Perez, Rico Constantino, Rocky Romero, Ricky Reyes, Alex Koslov, Kia "Awesome Kong" Stevens, Lena Yada and Layla El. He formed the School of Hard Knocks training facility with Bill Anderson, who left to form his own training camp. In 2006, he was inducted into the Southern California Pro-Wrestling Hall of Fame.

Lizarraga has refereed for promotions including WWF/World Wrestling Entertainment, National Wrestling Alliance, L.P.W.A. Ladies Professional Wrestling Association, Universal Wrestling Federation, and Women Of Wrestling, Paul Alperstein's American Wrestling Federation.

Acting roles for Lizarraga include the films Grunt: The Wrestling Movie, Bad Guys, Frontera Sin Ley, Ed Wood, Body Slam, and the TV series Mad About You.

Championships and accomplishments
Cauliflower Alley Club
Golden Ear Award (2014)

References

1950 births
American male professional wrestlers
American professional wrestlers of Mexican descent
Living people
Place of birth missing (living people)
Professional wrestling promoters
Professional wrestling referees
University of Missouri alumni